Renata Šašak-Ružir (born 14 June 1964) is a former Yugoslavian professional tennis player.

Biography
Born in Zagreb, Šašak debuted for the Yugoslavia Federation Cup team in 1979. One of her Federation Cup doubles teammates was Mima Jaušovec, who Šašak teamed up with to win a gold medal at the 1979 Mediterranean Games. She won a further gold medal four years in Casablanca at the 1983 Mediterranean Games, beating Laura Golarsa to win the women's singles.

Šašak competed in the main draw of both the French Open and US Open during her career. Her best performance came at the 1983 French Open, where she made it to the second round, then took fifth seed Pam Shriver to a third set before being eliminated. She was awarded the Croatian Sportswoman of the Year award from Sportske novosti in 1983.

At the 1984 Summer Olympics in Los Angeles, Šašak represented Yugoslavia in the women's singles event, for what was then a demonstration sport. She fell in the second round, after beating third seed Laura Arraya.

Šašak played Federation Cup tennis until 1987, in a total of 15 ties. This included Yugoslavia's run to the 1984 semi-finals, which they lost to eventual champions Czechoslovakia.

References

https://issuu.com/hrvatskiolimpijskiodbor/docs/hrvatska_i_sportasice_na_olimpijski/106

External links
 
 
 

1964 births
Living people
Yugoslav female tennis players
Croatian female tennis players
Olympic tennis players of Yugoslavia
Tennis players at the 1984 Summer Olympics
Mediterranean Games gold medalists for Yugoslavia
Mediterranean Games medalists in tennis
Competitors at the 1979 Mediterranean Games
Competitors at the 1983 Mediterranean Games
Tennis players from Zagreb
Universiade medalists in tennis
Universiade bronze medalists for Yugoslavia
Medalists at the 1987 Summer Universiade